The Andersonville Commercial Historic District is a historic district in Chicago, Illinois. It runs from 4800 North Clark Street to 5800 North Clark Street in the city's Uptown and Edgewater neighborhoods. The area is home to a heavily Swedish American community.

Many buildings in the district have remained intact since the early twentieth century. The district was added to the National Register of Historic Places on March 9, 2010.

References

Historic districts in Chicago
North Side, Chicago
Swedish-American culture in Chicago
Commercial buildings on the National Register of Historic Places in Chicago
Historic districts on the National Register of Historic Places in Illinois